The Luxembourgian Footballer of the Year is an award granted every season to a football player from Luxembourg's domestic top-flight National Division, rewarding the player judged to have been the most valuable to his team that season.  It is awarded by the sports desk of d'Wort, Luxembourg's most-read daily newspaper.  It has been awarded every year since 1988, and has been named the Guy Greffrath Challenge after Guy Greffrath, the long-time sports editor at d'Wort, since 1997.

Winners

References

Association football player of the year awards by nationality
Footballer of the Year
 
Awards established in 1988
1988 establishments in Luxembourg
Annual events in Luxembourg
Luxembourg National Division
Association football player non-biographical articles